Yeshivat Shaare Torah (more popularly known as Shaare Torah or just Shaare) is a 501(c)(3) non-profit organization that operates five Sephardic private Jewish day school programs located in Brooklyn, New York, United States.
 It includes single-gender elementary schools and high schools for boys and girls. The boys' high school has 309 students and the girls' high school has 120 students. The organization also operates a preschool program for 60 children.

Teaching philosophy

Shaare Torah is affiliated philosophically with Orthodox Judaism.

Student demographics

Shaare Torah primarily caters to the Sephardic Jewish community of Brooklyn, but also has students from around the Tri-State area.

After high school graduation

Graduates are encouraged to participate in year-long programs at yeshivot and seminaries in Israel. Afterwards, some continue their studies in similar institutions, while others enroll in university, or go straight into the workforce. Some of the most popular universities among Shaare alumni, such as Brooklyn College and Baruch College, grant up to one year's worth of credit to students who study in Israel, allowing them to apply these credits to their undergraduate degree.

History

In 2009, 34 students at the girl's elementary school were injured when a sidewalk grate collapsed during a graduation ceremony. The girl's elementary school has about 300 students. That same year, the school closed due to the swine flu epidemic.

In 2015, the school hosted a political rally promoting tax credits for parents of children in private schools. New York Governor Andrew Cuomo spoke at the event, as did City Council Member David G. Greenfield.

Athletics

The boy's high school has athletic teams competing in softball, basketball, and flag football. The school is a member of the Metropolitan Yeshiva High School Athletic League.

Leadership

The rosh yeshiva of Shaare Torah is Hillel Haber, a Syrian Jew raised in Brooklyn. Haber, who had previously moved to Israel for 14 years to further his study of Torah at Yeshivat Kol Yaakov, returned to Brooklyn to found Shaare Torah.

References

External links
 

Private elementary schools in Brooklyn
Private middle schools in Brooklyn
Private high schools in Brooklyn
Private K-12 schools in New York City
Jewish education
Jewish day schools in New York (state)
Orthodox yeshivas in Brooklyn
Sephardi Jewish culture in New York City
Syrian-American culture in New York City
Syrian-Jewish culture in New York (state)
Boys' schools in New York (state)
Girls' schools in New York City